The Boothtown Aqueduct is a heritage-listed 19th-century water bridge in Greystanes, Sydney, New South Wales, Australia. Established in 1888, the aqueduct was built to cross a valley to carry water from Prospect Reservoir to residents of Greater Western Sydney. 

Part of the Lower Prospect Canal Reserve, the aqueduct was the longest continuous concrete work of its kind in Australia in the late 19th century and early 20th century. It was listed in November 1991 in the New South Wales Heritage Database.

The aqueduct was constructed as a part of the Upper Nepean Scheme to convey water from the new Prospect reservoir to the new Potts Hill reservoir.

History
In 1892, after the parapet walls of the aqueduct fell into the creek below it, the walls were reconstructed and restrengthened with a concrete lining and tie rods. Due to its failings to have its capacity inflated, the aqueduct was bypassed in 1907 with the establishment of the inverted syphon.

The aqueduct was subject to demolition in the 1990s but due to objections by the local community, the aqueduct and surrounding reserve area were saved and finally included as part of the Western Sydney Cycle Network. The NSW State Government catered $100,000 in funding and a cycleway was constructed over a few years beginning in 2001 and completed in 2003. 

In 1907 the aqueduct was by-passed with a 3 metre wide, reinforced concrete syphon, built on the southern side that allowed the water supply to cross the valley using gravity to push the water up into the canal on the other side. Nearly a century later, the Lower Canal and syphon was superseded after a pipeline was established in the 1990s, and the bush reserve surrounding the canal opened to the public in 2003 as a cycleway.

Design

The bridge is made up of 22 arches made of brick, each of  span with a  clear span of brick with sandstone springers and was named after John Booth. The aqueduct has a look of an architectural puzzle, expanding and decreasing in size, with the arches aligning differently with each change of aspect. Today, the concrete legs have weathered look, stained by rain and weather. Some vandalism is present on the bridge's arches.

The towers are made of rendered brick, embellished with cement-furnished castellation and doorways that are lancet-arched. The aqueduct was blocked with concrete plugs to divert water into the tube and into a large new concrete pipe. The tube inlets were built as ornate fortified towers with steel trash racks and sluice gates to control the water flow. Fairly decorative features are integrated into the brickwork, such as dentilation, pilasters to each arch and string courses of round cast bricks. The side walls are secured by tie rods.

Access
Boothtown Aqueduct is located on Macquarie Road within a stretch of bushy parks in the suburb of Greystanes. It is surrounded and obscured by residential housings which was built in the 1960s. The aqueduct can also be accessed from Gipps Road to the west, with a number of Transit Systems Sydney bus stops close to the bridge on both roads. A pedestrian cycleway passes along the top of the aqueduct as it crosses Boothtown Gully, and west to Prospect Reservoir. Cycleways and walking tracks meander through the western suburbs, with connections across much of the Sydney metropolitan area.

Gallery

See also

Bankstown Reservoir, another historical water supply
Lansdowne Bridge, another historical bridge in western Sydney

References

External links

Lower Prospect Canal Reserve

1888 establishments in Australia
Aqueducts in Australia
Bridges completed in 1888
Bridges in Sydney
Buildings and structures in Sydney
New South Wales Heritage Database
Protected areas established in 1888
Romanesque Revival architecture in Australia
Sydney Water
Tourist attractions in Sydney
Upper Nepean Scheme